Burak Arıkan (born in 1976, Istanbul) is a Turkish contemporary artist. His work is based on complex networks, and thereby generates data and inputs in the custom abstract machine. Arikan is the founder of Graph Commons, a platform for mapping, analyzing, and publishing data-networks. Graph Commons workshop for artists, activists, critical researchers, and civil society organizations are being conducted internationally.

One of Arikan's works MyPocket (2008) is a live software system that predicts what the artist buys every day and discloses his spending records to the world. MyPocket was shown in Neuberger Museum of Art New York, Künstlerhaus Bethanien Berlin, and Media Space / FilmWinter Stuttgart, and most recently in the New Observatory exhibition in FACT Liverpool.

Arikan is an adjunct faculty in Interactive Telecommunications Program, Tisch School of Arts, New York University.

Arikan completed his master's degree at the MIT Media Lab in Massachusetts Institute of Technology in the Physical Language Workshop led by John Maeda.

Arikan is a member of Alternative Informatics Association, a civil society organization in Turkey focusing on the issues of Internet freedom and digital rights.

References

External links
 http://burak-arikan.com
 
 
 
 
 
 
 
 
 
 
 
 Civil Society Workshop Series, Istanbul–Paris, 2009.
 Discrimination Maps.  Ayrımcılık Ağları, 2009–2010.
 
Physical Language Workshop

Massachusetts Institute of Technology alumni
Living people
Turkish contemporary artists
Turkish conceptual artists
Digital artists
1976 births
Tisch School of the Arts faculty
MIT Media Lab people